Bloody Lake is a lake in Murray County, in the U.S. state of Minnesota.

The name Bloody Lake commemorates the Dakota War of 1862.

References

Lakes of Minnesota
Lakes of Murray County, Minnesota